"Dirty" is a song by American rock band Sevendust. It was released on March 16, 2018 by Rise as the first single from the band twelfth studio album, All I See Is War. The official music video of the song was released on the same day, directed by Caleb Mallery.

Charts

References

External links

Sevendust songs
2018 singles
2018 songs
Songs written by Lajon Witherspoon
Songs written by Clint Lowery
Songs written by John Connolly (musician)
Songs written by Vinnie Hornsby
Songs written by Morgan Rose
American hard rock songs